Chastity piercings are types of genital piercings that can be used to impose chastity in males and females.

Females
A ring or other device is used to hold the labia closed, preventing the wearer from having vaginal sexual intercourse.  When denial of direct stimulation of the clitoris is the goal, a rigid shield can be fastened over the clitoral area with labial piercings.

Males
In males, chastity piercing can be performed several ways. Through infibulation (piercing the foreskin closed), a Prince Albert or frenulum piercing using a smaller gauge locking mechanism (preventing intercourse), or chaining a Prince Albert piercing to a guiche piercing (thus preventing an erection).  More commonly, a piercing can be used in combination with a chastity device to anchor the penis within the device and prevent it from being pulled out the back. The Prince Albert is the most popular piercing for this purpose.

See also
Chastity belt (BDSM)
Cock and ball torture
Erotic sexual denial
Erotic humiliation
Genital piercing

References

Genital piercings